Francisco de Jesús Rivera Figueras (born 4 June 1948), known as Paquito D'Rivera, is a Cuban-American alto saxophonist, clarinetist and composer. He was a member of the Cuban songo band Irakere and, since the 1980s, he has established himself as a bandleader in the United States. His smooth saxophone tone and his frequent combination of Latin jazz and classical music have become his trademarks.

Early life and education
Francisco de Jesús Rivera Figueras was born on 4 June 1948 in Havana, Cuba. His father played classical saxophone, entertained his son with Duke Ellington and Benny Goodman records, and he sold musical instruments. He took D'Rivera to clubs like the Tropicana (frequented by his musician friends and customers) and to concert bands and orchestras.

At age five, D'Rivera began saxophone lessons by his father. In 1960, he attended the Havana Conservatory of Music, where he learned saxophone and clarinet and met Chucho Valdés. In 1965, he was a featured soloist with the Cuban National Symphony Orchestra. He and Valdés founded Orchestra Cubana de Música Moderna and then in 1973 the group Irakere, which fused jazz, rock, classical, and Cuban music.

Defection
By 1980, D'Rivera had become dissatisfied with the constraints placed on his music in Cuba for many years. In an interview with ReasonTV, D'Rivera recalled that the Cuban communist government described jazz and rock and roll as "imperialist" music that was officially discouraged in the 1960s/70s, and that a meeting with Che Guevara sparked his desire to leave Cuba. In early 1980, while on tour in Spain, he sought asylum with the American Embassy, leaving his wife and child behind, with a promise to bring them out of Cuba.

Upon his arrival in the United States, D'Rivera found great support for him and his family. His mother, Maura, and his sister, Rosario, had left Cuba in 1968 and became US citizens. Maura had worked in the US in the fashion industry for many years, and Rosario had become a respected artist and entrepreneur. Paquito was introduced to the jazz scene at some prestigious clubs and concert halls in New York. He became something of a phenomenon after the release of his first two solo albums, Paquito Blowin'  (June 1981) and Mariel (July 1982).

In 2005, D'Rivera wrote a letter criticizing musician Carlos Santana for his decision to wear a T-shirt with the image of Che Guevara on it to the 2005 Academy Awards, citing Guevara's role in the execution of counter-revolutionaries in Cuba, including his own cousin.

Career
D'Rivera has performed in venues such as Carnegie Hall and played with the National Symphony Orchestra, London Symphony Orchestra, London Philharmonic Orchestra, Florida Philharmonic Orchestra, Bronx Arts Ensemble, Puerto Rico Symphony Orchestra, YOA Orchestra of the Americas, Costa Rica National Symphony, American Youth Philharmonic, and Simón Bolívar Symphony Orchestra.

Throughout his career in the United States, D'Rivera's albums have received reviews from critics and have hit the top of the jazz charts. His albums have shown a progression that demonstrates his extraordinary abilities in bebop, classical and Latin/Caribbean music. D'Rivera's expertise transcends musical genres as he is the only artist to ever have won Grammy Awards in both Classical and Latin Jazz categories.

D'Rivera was a judge for the 5th and 8th annual Independent Music Awards to support independent artists.

Paquito D'Rivera Quintet
The band backing D'Rivera consists of Peruvian bassist Oscar Stagnaro, Argentinean trumpeter Diego Urcola, American drummer Mark Walker, and pianist Alex Brown. As a whole they are named the "Paquito D'Rivera Quintet" and under this name they were awarded the Latin Grammy Award for Best Latin Jazz Album for the album Live at the Blue Note in 2001.

Personal life
D'Rivera resides in North Bergen, New Jersey.

Honors and awards

 2003 Doctorate Honoris Causa in Music, Berklee College of Music
 2004 Clarinet of the Year Award, Jazz Journalists Association
 2005 NEA Jazz Masters 
 2005 National Medal of Arts
 2006 Clarinet of the Year, Jazz Journalists Association
 2007 Composer in Residence, Caramoor Center for Music and the Arts
 2007 Fellowship Award for Music Composition, Guggenheim Foundation
 2007 Living Jazz Legend Award, The Kennedy Center and The Catherine B. Reynolds Foundation Series for Artistic Excellence
 2008 President's Award, International Association for Jazz Educators
 2012 Honorary Doctoral Degree, State University of New York at Old Westbury

Grammy Awards
 1979 Irakere, Best Latin Recording – 22nd Annual Grammy Awards
 1996 Portraits of Cuba won Best Latin Jazz Performance – 39th Annual Grammy Awards
 2000 Tropicana Nights won Best Latin Jazz Album – 1st Annual Latin Grammy Awards
 2001 Live at the Blue Note – won Best Latin Jazz Album – 2nd Annual Latin Grammy Awards
 2003 Historia del Soldad won Best Classical Album – 4th Annual Latin Grammy Awards
 2003 Brazilian Dreams won Best Latin Jazz Album – 4th Annual Latin Grammy Awards
 2004 "Merengue" won Best Instrumental Composition – 47th Annual Grammy Awards
 2008 Funk Tango won Best Latin Jazz Album – 50th Annual Grammy Awards
 2011 Panamericana Suite won Best Classical Contemporary Composition - 12th Annual Latin GRAMMY Awards
 2011 Panamericana Suite won Best Latin Jazz Album – 12th Annual Latin Grammy Awards
 2013 Song For Maura won Best Latin Jazz Album, Paquito D'Rivera with Trio Corrente, 56th Annual GRAMMY Awards
 2014 Song for Maura won Best Latin Jazz Album, Paquito D'Rivera with Trio Corrente, 15th Annual Latin GRAMMY Awards

Discography

As leader
 Blowin (Columbia, 1981)
 Mariel (Columbia, 1982)
 Live at Keystone Korner (Columbia, 1983)
 Why Not! (Columbia, 1984)
 Explosion (Columbia, 1986)
 A Tribute to Cal Tjader (Yemaya, 1986)
 Manhattan Burn (Columbia, 1987)
 Celebration (Columbia, 1988)
 Tico! Tico! (Chesky, 1989)
 Return to Ipanema (Town Crier, 1989)
 Reunion (Messidor, 1991)
 Havana Cafe (Chesky, 1992)
 Who's Smoking?! (Candid, 1992)
 La Habana-Rio-Conexion (Messidor, 1992)
 Paquito D'Rivera Presents 40 Years of Cuban Jam Session (Messidor, 1993)
 A Night in Englewood (Messidor, 1994)
 Portraits of Cuba (Chesky, 1996)
 Live at Manchester Craftsmen's Guild (MCG, 1997)
 Hay Solucion (BMG, 1998)
 100 Years of Latin Love Songs (Heads Up, 1998)
 Tropicana Nights (Chesky, 1999)
 Habanera (Enja, 2000)
 The Clarinetist Volume One (Peregrina, 2001)
 Brazilian Dreams (MCG, 2002)
 Este Camino Largo (Yemaya, 2002)
 The Lost Sessions (Yemaya, 2002)
 Big Band Time (Pimienta, 2003)
 The Jazz Chamber Trio (Chesky, 2005)
 Benny Goodman Revisited (Connector, 2009)
 Quartier Latin (LKY, 2009)
 Panamericana Suite (MCG Jazz, 2010)
 Tango Jazz (Paquito, 2010)
 Song for Maura (Sunnyside/Paquito, 2013)
 Jazz Meets the Classics (Paquito, 2014)
 Aires Tropicales (Sunnyside/Paquito, 2015)
 Paquito & Manzanero (Sunnyside/Paquito, 2016)
 I Missed You Too! (Sunnyside/Paquito Records, 2022)

As sideman
With Diego Urcola Quartet
 El Duelo (Sunnyside, 2020)

With David Amram
 Havana/New York (Flying Fish, 1978)
 Latin Jazz Celebration (Elektra Musician, 1983)

With Mario Bauza
 Afro-Cuban Jazz (Caiman, 1986)
 Tanga (Messidor, 1992)

With Caribbean Jazz Project
 The Caribbean Jazz Project (Heads Up, 1995)
 Island Stories (Heads Up, 1997)
 The Gathering (Concord Picante, 2002)
 Mosaic (Concord Picante, 2006)

With Gloria Estefan
 Mi Tierra (Epic, 1993)
 Hold Me, Thrill Me, Kiss Me (Epic, 1994)

With Carlos Franzetti
 Prometheus (Audiophile, 1984)
 New York Toccata (Verve, 1985)

With Dizzy Gillespie
 Live at the Royal Festival Hall (Enja, 1990)
 To Bird with Love (Telarc, 1992)
 Bird Songs: The Final Recordings(Telarc, 1997)

With Conrad Herwig
 Another Kind of Blue (Half Note, 2004)
 Sketches of Spain y Mas (Half Note, 2006)

With Irakere
 Irakere (Columbia, 1979)
 Chekere Son (JVC, 1979)
 2 (Columbia, 1979)

With Yo-Yo Ma
 Obrigado Brazil (Sony Classical, 2003)
 Obrigado Brazil Live in Concert (Sony Classical, 2004)
 Appassionato (Sony Classical, 2007)
 Songs of Joy & Peace (Sony Classical, 2008)

With Andy Narell
 The Passage (Heads Up, 2004)
 University of Calypso (Heads Up, 2009)

With Daniel Ponce
 New York Now! (Celluloid, 1983)
 Arawe (Antilles, 1987)

With Claudio Roditi
 Red on Red (CTI, 1984)
 Milestones (Candid, 1992)

With Lalo Schifrin
 More Jazz Meets the Symphony (Atlantic, 1994)
 Firebird: Jazz Meets the Symphony No. 3 (Four Winds, 1996)
 Gillespiana in Cologne (Aleph, 1998)

With Bebo Valdés
 Bebo Rides Again (Messidor, 1995)
 El Arte del Sabor (Blue Note, 2001)
 Suite Cubana (Calle 54, 2009)

With others
 Alex Acuña & Eva Ayllón, To My Country (Nido, 2002)
 Sergio Assad, Dances from the New World (GHA, 2013)
 Andres Boiarsky, Into the Light (Reservoir, 1997)
 Soledad Bravo, Mambembe (Top Hits, 1983)
 Soledad Bravo, Soledad Bravo (Sono-Rodven, 1985)
 Jeanie Bryson, Tonight I Need You So (Telarc, 1994)
 Cachao, Master Sessions Volume I (Sony, 1994)
 Cachao, Master Sessions Volume II (Epic, 1995)
 Michel Camilo, One More Once (Columbia, 1994)
 Valerie Capers, Come on Home (Sony, 1995)
 Ana Caram, Rio After Dark (Chesky, 1989)
 Regina Carter, I'll Be Seeing You (Verve 2006)
 Ed Cherry, First Take (Groovin' High 1993)
 Anat Cohen, Claroscuro (Anzic, 2012)
 Richie Cole, Kush (Heads Up, 1995)
 Chris Connor, Classic (Contemporary, 1987)
 Hilario Durán, From the Heart (Alma, 2006)
 Sui Generis, Sinfonias Para Adolescentes (2000)
 Giovanni Hidalgo, Villa Hidalgo (Messidor, 1992)
 Levon Ichkhanian, After Hours (Jazz Heritage Society 1996)
 Denise Jannah, I Was Born in Love with You (Blue Note, 1995)
 Dana Leong, Leaving New York (Tateo Sound 2006)
 Herbie Mann, 65th Birthday Celebration (Lightyear, 1997)
 Herbie Mann, America, Brasil (Lightyear, 1997)
 Raul Midon, A World Within a World (Manhattan, 2007)
 Michael Philip Mossman, The Orisha Suite (Connector, 2001)
 Chico O'Farrill, Heart of a Legend (Milestone, 1999)
 Makoto Ozone, Live & Let Live (Verve, 2011)
 Rosa Passos, Amorosa (Sony Classical, 2004)
 Oscar Peñas, Music of Departures and Returns (Musikoz, 2014)
 Roberto Perera, Seduction (Heads Up, 1994)
 Astor Piazzolla, The Rough Dancer and the Cyclical Night (American Clave, 1988)
 Tito Puente, Live at the Village Gate (Bellaphon, 1993)
 Bobby Sanabria, New York City Ache! (Flying Fish, 1993)
 Bernardo Sassetti, Salsetti (West Wind, 2000)
 Omar Sosa, Mulatos (Ota 2004)
 Janis Siegel, Experiment in White (Wounded Bird, 2002)
 Clark Terry, Live at the Village Gate (Chesky, 1991)
 McCoy Tyner, La Leyenda de La Hora (Columbia, 1981)
 Turtle Island String Quartet, Danzon (Koch, 2005)
 Nancy Wilson, R.S.V.P. (Rare Songs, Very Personal) (MCG, 2004)

References

External links

Biography at official website
Paquito D'Rivera at Boosey & Hawkes
Discography at official website

1948 births
Living people
20th-century American male musicians
20th-century clarinetists
20th-century American saxophonists
21st-century American male musicians
21st-century clarinetists
21st-century American saxophonists
American jazz clarinetists
American jazz composers
American male jazz composers
American jazz saxophonists
American male saxophonists
American jazz musicians
American bandleaders
Afro-Cuban jazz clarinetists
Afro-Cuban jazz composers
Afro-Cuban jazz saxophonists
Chesky Records artists
Cuban emigrants to the United States
Cuban exiles
Cuban jazz musicians
Grammy Award winners
Latin jazz clarinetists
Latin jazz composers
Latin jazz saxophonists
Latin Grammy Award winners
People from Havana
People from North Bergen, New Jersey
United States National Medal of Arts recipients
Caribbean Jazz Project members
Irakere members
The Blackout All-Stars members